Nurney Cross is a stone cross located in Nurney, County Carlow, Ireland, and is an early example of a high cross.

The site was a monastic site founded by Abbán in the 5th century AD and the cross is believed to date from that time.

Description

The cross is a circle-headed cross embedded in the ground near St. John's Church of Ireland, Nurney.

References

National Monuments in County Carlow
High crosses in the Republic of Ireland